Sederberg is a surname. Notable people with the surname include:

Arelo C. Sederberg (1930–2020), American financial journalist, television commentator, public relations executive, and novelist
Thomas Sederberg, American computer graphics researcher and academic administrator

See also
Söderberg